Happy Ero Christmas is a 2003 South Korean romantic comedy film starring Cha Tae-hyun and Kim Sun-a.

Plot
Byung-ki (Cha Tae-hyun) is a taciturn village patrolman who helps out with trivial tasks like distributing promotional papers, though he dreams of fighting evil. One day, he runs into Min-kyung (Kim Sun-a), an employee at the neighborhood bowling alley, and falls for her at first sight. However, his attempts to woo her go unnoticed. Meanwhile, Seok-doo (Park Yeong-gyu), the boss of the local gang, also swoons over Min-kyung and vows to take her virginity on Christmas Eve.

Cast
 Cha Tae-hyun as Sung Byung-ki
 Kim Sun-a as Heo Min-kyung
 Park Yeong-gyu as Bang Seok-doo
 Hong Kyung-in as Noh Dong-chool
 Kim Ji-young as Park Hyang-sook
 Park Won-sang as Henchman 1
 Yang Ik-june as Henchman 2
 Jang Hang-sun as Ero chairman
 Kim Jung-ki as Baek Chil-yong
 Oh Tae-kyung as Jo Dong-kwan
 Baek Bong-ki as Noh Hae-chool
 Lee Chung-ah as Lee Hae-min
 Lee Mi-hwa as Lee Bo-young
 Park Choong-seon as Police substation chief
 Jung Suk-yong as Sergeant Park
 Jeon Seon-hwa as Lee Soo-jin
 Yoo Seung-ho as Children's angel choir

References

External links
 
 
 

2003 films
2000s Korean-language films
South Korean romantic comedy films
2003 romantic comedy films
2000s South Korean films